Midway is a census-designated place in Baxter County, Arkansas, United States. Per the 2020 census, the population was 1,036. Midway has a post office with ZIP code 72651.

Demographics

2020 census

Note: the US Census treats Hispanic/Latino as an ethnic category. This table excludes Latinos from the racial categories and assigns them to a separate category. Hispanics/Latinos can be of any race.

Transportation
Midway is at the intersection of Highway 5, Highway 126 and Highway 178. Highway 5 provides access to Mountain Home to the east and extends about eight miles to the north to the Arkansas - Missouri border. Highway 126 provides access to the Baxter County Regional Airport to the south and on to Gassville. Highway 178 provides access to Lakeview, Bull Shoals and the Bull Shoals Lake to the west.

School district
Midway is in the Mountain Home School District.

Notable person

References

External links
 Map of Baxter County (US Census Bureau)
 Mountain Home School District
 Baxter County Historical and Genealogical Society

Census-designated places in Baxter County, Arkansas
Census-designated places in Arkansas